The Loomis–Parry Residence is a mixed-style residential house, constructed in 1917, in Augusta, Kansas. It is a 2-story structure, with an irregular floor plan, that retains nearly all of its original materials, including exterior brick walls and double-hung wooden windows. It has been continuously owned by the same family who originally constructed it. A widow named Henrietta Loomis commissioned the house as a residence for herself and her daughter. Her husband's family, who had been farmers, owned land in Butler County where oil was discovered in the early 1900s. The oil revenue financed the construction. The Loomis–Parry Residence was added to the National Register of Historic Places in 2009.

See also 
 National Register of Historic Places listings in Butler County, Kansas

References

External links

Houses completed in 1917
Houses in Butler County, Kansas
Houses on the National Register of Historic Places in Kansas
Augusta, Kansas
National Register of Historic Places in Butler County, Kansas